The Bakhta is a river in Krasnoyarsk Krai, Russia. It is a right hand tributary of the Yenisey.

The lower reaches of the river are navigable.

Course
The Bakhta has its source in the Tunguska Plateau, part of the western side of the Central Siberian Plateau. It begins flowing northwestwards, then it bends about midway through its course and flows roughly southwestwards. 

The Bakhta flows in a remote mountainous area through a narrow valley surrounded by taiga until it leaves the plateau area and flows across the Yenisei plain.
The Bakhta joins the right bank of the Yenisey at Bakhta village. The confluence is located roughly halfway between the mouths of the Podkamennaya Tunguska and Nizhnyaya Tunguska. The river freezes in mid-October and stays frozen until mid-May.

A section of the lower course of the river, including its confluence with the Yenisei are located in the Central Siberia Nature Reserve.

See also
List of rivers of Russia

References

External links

Fishing in Russia
Rivers of Krasnoyarsk Krai